Beverly Matherne (born March 15, 1946 in Louisiana) is an American writer and poet.

Born in Acadiana, along the Mississippi River, by New Orleans she studied French literature at the University of California, Berkeley. She is a strong defender of French language in Louisiana, and a member of  CIEF (Conseil International d'Études Francophones). She has published her poems in numerous magazines and  several bilingual poetry books in French and English.
She was awarded with some literature prizes and is a professor at Northern Michigan University. She currently lives  in Marquette.
[[File:Homage to Beverly Matherne.JPG|thumb|upright|right|Homage to Beverly Matherne's poem The Blues Cryin''', painting by Gianpiero Actis, Italy]]

WorksImages cadiennes (Cajun Images), 1994Je me souviens de la Louisiane (I Remember Louisiana), 1994La Grande Pointe (Grand Point), 1995Le blues braillant (The Blues Cryin'), 1999Lamothe-Cadillac:Sa jeunesse en France (Lamothe-Cadillac: His Early Days in France),  2009.
 Bayou Des Acadiens (Blind River''), ~2016

External links
Beverly Matherne's website - sample poems, upcoming readings, biographical information
www.mioch.net

1946 births
Living people
Poets from Louisiana
Poets from Michigan
American poets in French
American writers in French
Northern Michigan University faculty
American women poets
20th-century American poets
20th-century American women writers
21st-century American poets
21st-century American women writers
University of California, Berkeley alumni
People from Marquette, Michigan
American women academics